Iryna Zolotarevych is a Ukrainian communications expert, social activist and director of the World Communication Forum Davos in Kyiv.

Biography 
In 2014, Zolotarevych co-founded the WCFDavos, in Kyiv, and she remains a member of the WCFA Executive Board. From 2011 to 2015, she was the Director of Pleon Talan Communications Agency, where she and her team won the Effie Ukraine award for their work on the communication digital project, Babyn Yar at IPRA Golden World Awards.

In 2015, she launched a new agency in AGAMA Communications portfolio, specializing in public affairs, GR and reputation management: GROU.

As UAPR Board member, Iryna chairs the Organizing Committee of Pravda Awards PR contest and supervises the UAPR for Students program.

Iryna Zolotarevych is the author and co-author of over 100 communications lectures and trainings, she is also a senior teacher in Institute of International Relations.

In 2007, Iryna Zolotarevych was one of the initiators of the project aimed at improving financial literacy among Ukrainian children, Detki-Monetki. Today, it is already operating in four countries.

Continuing development of financial literacy topics, Iryna Zolotarevych published four co-authored books on entrepreneurship, school textbook on financial literacy, as well as games and advice.

Iryna was repeatedly invited to discuss state strategy for information society development and IT support in Ukraine.

Her personal achievements includes the most prestigious Ukrainian award for PR Leaders (Coryphei). Since August 2016, she’s also been the advisor for Communications to the Prime Minister of Ukraine.

Publications 
 Person in the Center of Attention: Column by I. Zolotarevych in the Forbes Ukraine.
 The Right Words—Lessons of WCFDavos Kyiv 2015 communications: Column by I. Zolotarevych in the Capital.
 Iryna Zolotarevych: The Employer Is Not Ready to Risk—І. Zolotarevych’s column at Dengi.UA.

References 

Year of birth missing (living people)
Living people
Ukrainian women activists
Ukrainian public relations people
Ukrainian women writers